Tung Yun-Chi (東 昀錡, born December 27, 1981, in Kaohsiung) is a Taiwanese softball player. She competed for the Chinese Taipei women's national softball team at the 2004 and 2008 Summer Olympics.

References

Living people
1981 births
Olympic softball players of Taiwan
Taiwanese softball players
Softball players at the 2004 Summer Olympics
Softball players at the 2008 Summer Olympics
Sportspeople from Kaohsiung
Asian Games medalists in softball
Softball players at the 2006 Asian Games
Softball players at the 2002 Asian Games
Medalists at the 2002 Asian Games
Medalists at the 2006 Asian Games
Asian Games silver medalists for Chinese Taipei